Danum Valley Conservation Area is  a 438 square kilometres tract of relatively undisturbed lowland dipterocarp forest in Sabah, Malaysia. It has an extensive diversity of tropical flora and fauna, including such species as the rare Bornean orangutans, gibbons, mousedeer, clouded leopards and over 270 bird species. Activities offered are jungle treks, river swimming, bird watching, night jungle tours and excursions to nearby logging sites and timber mills.

The area holds unique status in the sense that before it became a conservation area there were no human settlements within the area, meaning that hunting, logging and other human interference was non existent making the area almost unique. It is managed by Yayasan Sabah for conservation, research, education, and habitat restoration training purposes. There have been proposals to nominate the site as a UNESCO World Heritage Site.

Geography 
The nearest town, Lahad Datu is about 82 km away (about a 2 hours drive on mainly logging roads). Danum Valley Field Centre is a research establishment for scientists and education purposes, and a nursery for propagating Dipterocarpus trees by the 100,000s. There are few lodges here for tourists, one of the most established lodges is the Borneo Rainforest Lodge. From here visitors can do guided walks through lowland rainforest trails and night safari walks or drives, and many people go there mainly for bird watching and wildlife sightings. Other lodges include Danum Valley Field Centre and the newest one, Kawag Nature Lodge.
The valley is bowl-shaped, with a maximum land height of 1093m.

Natural history

Fauna 
The lowland tropical rainforest is home to many birds and mammals. It is the only place where the enigmatic spectacled flowerpecker has been recorded. Bornean orangutans, Müller's Bornean gibbons, and other primates, including Horsfield's tarsier, as well as deer, wild cats and the rare Bornean pygmy elephant may be seen. Other notable species that inhabit the area are the sun bear and Bornean rhinoceros. The rich insect fauna has been one of the main areas of research in which the Danum Valley Field Centre has been active, and the land snail fauna is also considered one of the richest in the world, with at least 61 species recorded from a 1-km-plot.

Flora 
Flora is primarily that of the Borneo lowland rain forest habitat, with dipterocarp trees predominating. In places the forest canopy reaches a height of over 70 meters.
The greatest diversity of Dipterocarpus species occur on Borneo. Species endemic or native to the island include D. acutangulus, D. applanatus, D. borneensis, D. caudatus, D. caudiferus, D. confertus, D. conformis, D. coriaceus, D. costulatus, D. crinitus, D. elongatus, D. eurynchus, D. fusiformis, D. geniculatus, D. glabrigemmatus, D. globosus, D. gracilis, D. grandiflorus, D. hasseltii, D. humeratus, D. kerrii, D. mundus, D. ochraceus, D. palembanicus, D. sarawakensis, D. tempehes, D. validus and D. verrucosus. The valley is home to over 15,000 plant species, though 94% of the plants belong to the dipterocarp genus. Other flora seen in the valley are pitcher plants. In 2019, the world's tallest tropical tree was discovered in the valley.

See also 
 Borneo lowland rain forest ecoregion
 Deforestation in Borneo

References

External links 

 Danum Valley Field Centre
 Photos from Danum Valley

Borneo
Protected areas of Sabah
Nature conservation in Malaysia
Borneo lowland rain forests